László Szabados may refer to:
 László Szabados (1911–1997), a Hungarian swimmer
 László Szabados (astronomer) (born 1948), a Hungarian astronomer

See also 
 Asteroid 265490 Szabados, named after the astronomer